I. indica may refer to:
 Iole indica, the yellow-browed bulbul, a passerine bird species
 Ipomoea indica, a plant species

See also
 Indica (disambiguation)